Nathalie Roy (born 8 May 1964) is a Canadian politician. She is a member of the National Assembly of Quebec for the riding of Montarville, first elected in the 2012 election. She is currently serving as the Ministry of Culture and Communications (Quebec). Prior to her election, Roy served as a journalist and news anchor with TVA Nouvelles.

In August 2016, Roy came out as against Burkini and Hijab. Saying these are accessories of Radical Islam.

In August 2019, as Minister of Culture, Roy announced the allocation of $15 million to preserve the cultural heritage that the churches of Quebec embody, and $5 million for the requalification of places of worship.

Cabinet posts

Electoral record

|align="left" colspan=2 bgcolor="#FFFFFF"|Coalition Avenir Québec notional gain from Liberal
|align="right" colspan=2 bgcolor="#FFFFFF"|Swing
|align="right" bgcolor="#FFFFFF"| +18.43

References

External links

 

Living people
Coalition Avenir Québec MNAs
1964 births
People from Gaspésie–Îles-de-la-Madeleine
21st-century Canadian politicians
21st-century Canadian women politicians
Canadian women lawyers
Lawyers in Quebec
Members of the Executive Council of Quebec
Women government ministers of Canada
Women MNAs in Quebec